The Live Album: Sólo Éxitos is the first live album by bachata singer Henry Santos as a solo artist. This is his second production to be released under his own record label, HustleHard Entertainment on February 24, 2017. This album features his best songs from his first three solo studio albums and his songs from his time with Aventura. All tracks are performed live.

Track listing

Personnel
The following credits are from Santos's record label website:

Album credits

 HustleHard Entertainment LLC - executive producer
 Henry Santos Jeter - producers
 Lincoln Castaneda - producers & sound engineer
 Joangel Rosario 'El Diablito' - arranger
 Rodolfo De La Rosa - arranger
 Jose E. Torres-Nuñez - arranger
 Richard Jay Lopez - arranger
 Julio "Fragancia" Abreu - mastering engineer

Live band
List of personnel who played in the live shows.

 Henry Santos Jeter - lead vocal
 Daniella Silverio - background vocal
 Miguel Vasquez - backing vocal
 Joangel Rosario 'El Diablito' - lead guitar
 Oscar 'Scissor Hands' Nuñez - rhythm guitar, requinto
 Joel Rodriguez - bongos
 Francisco Rosario - güira
 Joel Sanchez - keyboard
 Rodolfo De La Rosa - bass
 Ernesto Maldonado - congas
 Aldo Luis Arjona - drums
 Victor Diaz - drums

Other production credits
List of personnel who organized the music.

 Joangel Rosario 'El Diablito' - guitars
 Jose E. Torres-Nuñez - guitars for "Y Eres Tan Bella"
 Richard Jay Lopez - guitars
 Joel Rodriguez - güira
 Dany Luna - güira
 Francisco Rosario - güira
 Rodolfo De La Rosa - keyboard, bass, congas, drums
 Anthony J. Rodriguez - bass
 Oscar De La Rosa - bass
 Raulito Bier - bongos
 Joel Rodriguez - bongos

Album images credit

 Titina Style - photography
 Erniel Rodriguez - photography
 Billy V. Santos - photography, Santos Media Group
 Gisselle Mendez - stylist
 3HE Graphics - graphic art
 Marcelino Nuñez - media content
 Latin Iconos - public relations
 Lester Hechavarria - webmaster

References

2017 live albums
Henry Santos albums
Spanish-language live albums
Live bachata albums